Bereitschaft Dr. Federau (The Ready Dr. Federau) is a German seven-part family television series based on a screenplay by Karl Heinz Klimt. It was broadcast between 1987 and 1988 in East Germany.

See also
List of German television series

External links
 

German medical television series
1987 German television series debuts
1988 German television series endings
German-language television shows
Television in East Germany